NO Apodis is a solitary, red hued variable star located in the southern circumpolar constellation Apus. It has an average apparent magnitude of 5.86, allowing it to be faintly seen with the naked eye. The object is relatively far at a distance of 790 light years but is drifting closer with a heliocentric radial velocity .

NO Apodis has a stellar classification of M3 III, indicating that it is a red giant. It is currently on the asymptotic giant branch, fusing hydrogen and helium shells around an inert carbon core.

NO Apodis is classified as a semiregular variable of unknown subtype. Observations from Tabur et. al. (2009) reveal it to have two periods, both lasting 26-7 days. During this timeframe, the star flucates between 5.71 and 5.95 in the visual band.

References

Apus (constellation)
Semiregular variable stars
156513
Apodis, NO
M-type giants
085760
6429
CD-80 00638
Apodis, 59